Watch House Terrace is a heritage-listed row of terraced houses at 66–80 Erskine Street, Sydney, City of Sydney, New South Wales, Australia. It was added to the New South Wales State Heritage Register on 2 April 1999.

History

Description

Heritage listing 
Watch House Terrace was listed on the New South Wales State Heritage Register on 2 April 1999.

See also

References

Attribution 

New South Wales State Heritage Register
Houses in New South Wales
Articles incorporating text from the New South Wales State Heritage Register
Sydney central business district